Oxford Instruments plc is a United Kingdom manufacturing and research company that designs and manufactures tools and systems for industry and research. The company is headquartered in Abingdon, Oxfordshire, England, with sites in the United Kingdom, United States, Europe, and Asia. It is listed on the London Stock Exchange and is a constituent of the FTSE 250 Index.

History

The company was founded by Sir Martin Wood in 1959, at his home in Northmoor Road, North Oxford, with help from his wife Audrey Wood (Lady Wood) to manufacture superconducting magnets for use in scientific research, starting in his garden shed in Northmoor Road, Oxford, England. It was the first substantial commercial spin-out company from the University of Oxford and was first listed on the London Stock Exchange in 1983.

It had a pioneering role in the development of magnetic resonance imaging, providing the first superconducting magnets for this application. The first commercial MRI whole body scanner was manufactured at its Osney Mead factory in Oxford in 1980 for installation at Hammersmith Hospital, London. Further innovations included the development of active shielding, whereby fringe fields hazardous to pacemaker wearers, causing difficulty and expense in siting, were virtually eliminated. Oxford Instruments was not able to capitalise on these inventions itself, granting royalty-free license to Philips and General Electric whilst developing a joint venture with Siemens in 1989: this was dissolved in 2004.

References 

Electronics companies of the United Kingdom
Engineering companies of the United Kingdom
British brands
Nanotechnology companies
Companies based in Oxford
Abingdon-on-Thames
Electronics companies established in 1959
Manufacturing companies established in 1959
1959 establishments in England
Companies listed on the London Stock Exchange
British companies established in 1959
Equipment semiconductor companies